Uralovka is a rural locality (a selo) and the administrative center of Uralovsky Selsoviet of Shimanovsky District, Amur Oblast, Russia. The population was 199 as of 2018. There are 13 streets.

Geography 
Uralovka is located on the Zeya River, 587 km northeast of Shimanovsk (the district's administrative centre) by road. Oktyabrsky is the nearest rural locality.

References 

Rural localities in Shimanovsky District